Owen Thomas (born March 30, 1972) is an American blogger, journalist, and entrepreneur. He is the business editor at The San Francisco Chronicle.

He was the founding executive editor of The Daily Dot and former executive editor of VentureBeat.  He was the managing editor of Valleywag, a Gawker Media gossip and news blog about Silicon Valley personalities that bills itself as a "tech gossip rag".

Career
Thomas graduated from Thomas Jefferson High School for Science and Technology. He is a 1994 graduate of the University of Chicago. He first worked at Suck.com, and later at the former technology magazine Business 2.0.

He was managing editor of the Silicon Valley gossip website Valleywag, before leaving to run NBC's local site for the San Francisco Bay Area.

Thomas does some on-screen commentary in the film Revenge of the Electric Car.

In 2013, Thomas was named Editor-in-Chief of ReadWrite. He joined the San Francisco Chronicle in 2016.

Valleywag
Thomas replaced Nick Denton as the managing editor of Valleywag on July 6, 2007. Valleywag, a two-man operation, was written mostly by Thomas, with help from its former editor, Nick Douglas.

In 2007, Thomas outed Peter Thiel as gay while Thiel was in Saudi Arabia on business in Valleywag.  In response, Thiel covertly funded lawsuits by third parties against Gawker Media, Valleywag's parent.  Thiel's role came to light in the aftermath of the Bollea v. Gawker verdict, which awarded Bollea, known professionally as Hulk Hogan, $140 million after Gawker published a sex tape of him.  Thomas contends that Thiel's sexuality was already "known to a wide circle", so his coverage did not constitute an outing.

References

External links
 Valleywag

1972 births
Living people
American bloggers
American columnists
American mass media company founders
American online journalists
American online publication editors
American technology journalists
Place of birth missing (living people)
Gawker Media
American LGBT journalists
Thomas Jefferson High School for Science and Technology alumni
University of Chicago alumni
21st-century American non-fiction writers